Many cultures consume blood, often in combination with meat. The blood may be in the form of blood sausage, as a thickener for sauces, a cured salted form for times of food scarcity, or in a blood soup. This is a product from domesticated animals, obtained at a place and time where the blood can run into a container and be swiftly consumed or processed. In many cultures, the animal is slaughtered. In some cultures, blood is a taboo food.

Blood is the most important byproduct of slaughtering. It consists predominantly of protein and water, and is sometimes called "liquid meat" because its composition is similar to that of lean meat. Blood collected hygienically can be used for human consumption, otherwise it is converted to blood meal. Special fractions of animal blood are used in human medicine.

Methods of preparation

Sausage

Blood sausage is any sausage made by cooking animal blood with a filler until it is thick enough to congeal when cooled. Pig or cattle blood is most often used. Typical fillers include meat, fat, suet, bread, rice, barley and oatmeal. Varieties include biroldo, black pudding, blood tongue, blutwurst, drisheen, kishka (kaszanka), morcilla, moronga, mustamakkara, sundae, verivorst, and many types of boudin.

Pancakes

Blood pancakes are encountered in Galicia (filloas), Scandinavia, and the Baltic; for example, Swedish blodplättar, Finnish veriohukainen, and Estonian veripannkoogid.

Soups, stews and sauces

Blood soups and stews, which use blood as part of the broth, include czernina, dinuguan, haejangguk, mykyrokka, pig's organ soup, tiet canh and svartsoppa.

Blood is also used as a thickener in sauces, such as coq au vin or pressed duck, and puddings, such as tiết canh. It can provide flavor or color for meat, as in cabidela.

Solidified
Blood can also be used as a solid ingredient, either by allowing it to congeal before use, or by cooking it to accelerate the process.  Blood curd is a dish typically found in Asia that consists of cooled and hardened animal blood.

In China, "blood tofu" is most often made with pig's or duck's blood, although chicken's or cow's blood may also be used. The blood is allowed to congeal and simply cut into rectangular pieces and cooked. This dish is also known in Java as saren, made with chicken's or pig's blood. Blood tofu is found in curry mee as well as the Sichuan dish, Mao Xue Wang. Chinese people use pig blood, tofu, and vegetables to make a healthy soup. This soup has a reputation as a healthy and tasty meal in China.

In Hungary when a pig is slaughtered in the morning, the blood is fried with onions and served for breakfast. In Peru they use chicken blood. 

In Korea, blood curd is typically made of cattle blood and is often used as an ingredient for different kinds of soups and stews, such as hangover soup.

In Tibet, congealed yak's blood is a traditional food.

In Vietnamese cuisine pig blood curd is used in soup based noodles dishes such as Bún bò Huế or Bánh canh.

Raw
In some cases, blood is used as an ingredient without any additional preparation. Raw blood is not commonly consumed by itself, but may be used as an addition to drinks or other dishes. One example is the drinking of seal blood which is traditionally believed by the Inuit to bring health benefits.

Nutrition bars
Russia and ex-USSR countries produce sweet nutrition bars containing cattle blood, known under the generic name Hematogen; originally created for treating anemia, they are also used like regular sweets nowadays.

Religious consumption of blood
The Catholic Church, as well as the Eastern Orthodox, Oriental Orthodox, and some Anglican churches, believe that in the sacrament of the Eucharist, the participants consume the real blood and body of Jesus Christ. The post-communion prayer of the 1662 Anglican Book of Common Prayer describes the meal as "spiritual food". Many other Christian denominations symbolically consume the Eucharist.

The medieval cult of saint Thomas Becket in England included the drinking of "water of Saint Thomas", a mix of water and the remains of the martyr's blood miraculously multiplied.
The procedure was frowned upon by the more orthodox due to the similarities with the eucharist.

Cultural considerations
Some cultures consider blood to be a taboo form of food. In Abrahamic religions, Jewish and Muslim cultures forbid the consumption of blood. Blood and its by-products are forbidden in Islam, in the Qurʼan, surah 5, al-Maʼidah, verse 3. In the New Testament, blood was forbidden by the Apostolic Decree due to banning sacrifice of animals before idols, and is still forbidden among Eastern Orthodox Churches. Catholic doctrine has been updated. See also Biblical law in Christianity and Communion (Christian).

The Igbo ethnic group of Nigeria has no explicit prohibitions against eating blood, but most regard it with disgust and refuse to eat any meat perceived as "bloody" or undercooked (such as raw meat in sushi or steak prepared raw, rare, or medium). Goats, cattle, and other animals slaughtered in the traditional Igbo manner are dispatched with a single cut across the neck and then most or all of the blood is allowed to slowly drain from the wound. This practice may have been influenced by the Igbo Jewish community that apparently predates contact with Europe. Many Igbos who buy butchered, packaged meat from groceries and supermarkets are in the habit of washing the blood from the meat with water before preparing it.

Jaffna People consider eating blood as disgusting and thus don't eat any blood or blood containing meat. 

The taboos may be rooted in the fact that consuming greater quantities of blood is actually poisonous.

Dishes

Africa 
Among the Maasai people, drinking blood from cattle is a part of the traditional diet, especially after special occasions such as ritual circumcision or the birth of a child.

Cow blood is also consumed by the Bahima people.

The Herero people consumed cow blood with sour milk.

Americas 
As in Europe, several varieties of blood sausage are also popular in Mexico, Newfoundland and Labrador and the southwest United States (moronga), Chile (prietas, ñache), Argentina, Uruguay, Cuba, and Puerto Rico (morcilla).

Brazil 
In Brazil, the traditional Portuguese dish known as cabidela (see above) is also eaten, as well a stew made of pork blood and offal called sarapatel. Chouriço is a blood sausage also eaten in Brazil, known as morcilla in Spanish.

Colombia 
In the western region of Santander Colombia, a dish called pepitoria is made from rice cooked in goat blood.

Mexico 
Mexicans from certain regions eat goat's stomach stuffed with pork blood and vegetables as a delicacy.

Perú 
In Perú, clotted chicken blood is fried with chili peppers and Welsh onion. This dish is called sangrecita.

Ecuador 
Yaguarlocro is a potato soup made with sprinklings of goat's blood.

Asia

China 

In China and some regions of Southeast Asia, coagulated chicken, duck, goose or pig blood, known in Chinese as "blood tofu" is used in soups. In Taiwan, pig's blood cake is made of pork blood and sticky rice. It is fried or steamed as a snack or cooked in a hot pot.

India 
In the South Indian state of Tamil Nadu, stir-fried lamb blood is a common dish had for breakfast and lunch. When prepared alone it is called . More commonly it is stir-fried with lamb stomach and intestines with spices like ginger, garlic, cloves, cinnamon, red chili powder, green chilies, coriander powder, cumin, shallots and grated coconut. This dish is very common in the Madurai and Kongu Nadu region of Tamil Nadu.

In the coastal Konkan region of India, Sorpotel, a dish of Portuguese origin is commonly cooked that includes parboiled meat and offal which is cooked in a spicy and vinegary sauce. Some people also use the animals' blood for boiling the curry. Sorpotel is primarily made by Catholics of Goa, Mangalore and East Indians of Mumbai.
In Kumaon, a spicy dish called Luvash is made by pan frying lamb blood with pahadi ghee.

Indonesia 
In Indonesia, especially the Batak tribe in North Sumatara, pig's blood is used as an ingredient and sauce mixed with andaliman (Zanthoxylum acantophodium) for a cuisine named Sangsang (read saksang).

In Joshua Oppenheimer's film The Look of Silence, several of the anti-Communist militias active in the Indonesian mass killings of 1965–66 claim that drinking blood from their victims is what prevented them going mad.

Korea 
In Korea, blood as food is known as seonji (derived from the Manchu word senggi meaning "blood"). Coagulated cattle seonji and dried radish greens are added to the beef legbone broth in order to make seonji-guk (blood curd soup). Sundae, a blood sausage made generally by boiling or steaming cow or pig's intestines that are stuffed with various ingredients, such as pig's blood, cellophane noodles, kimchi, scallions, etc.

Nepal 
In northern region of Nepal, Gyuma a blood sausage is a popular dish commonly eaten by locals. It is made of yak's blood and meat. The fillings also include buck wheat flour and other spices. The sausage is also used in lentils or prepared in stir fry dishes.

People of Newari community also consume popular dish called “hee,” which means blood that is prepared by steaming the blood with some local spices. It is consumed by most of the locals in Patan, kathmandu area of Nepal.

Philippines 

In the Philippines, a popular dish called dinuguan is made from pig's blood and offal seasoned with chili and is traditionally eaten with white rice or steamed rice cakes (puto). Numerous variants exist throughout the islands. Dinuguan can also be served without using any offal, using only choice cuts of pork. In Batangas, this version is known as sinungaok. It can also be made from beef and chicken meat, the latter being known as dinuguang manok ('chicken dinuguan'). The Northern Luzon versions of the dish namely the Ilocano dinardaraan and the Ibanag zinagan are often drier with toppings of deep-fried pork intestine cracklings. These versions are sometimes known as "crispy dinuguan" elsewhere. The Itawis of Cagayan also have a pork-based version that has larger meat chunks and more fat, which they call .

Aside from dinuguan, a native blood sausage known as pinuneg also exists among the Kankanaey people of the highlands of Luzon. Cubes of pork blood grilled on skewers is also a common street food throughout the Philippines. These are known colloquially as "betamax" (after its resemblance to Betamax tapes).

The Ilocano crispy pork dish bagnet may also sometimes be dipped in raw pig's blood. Though this is rare. In Western Visayas, the meat-and-liver stew bas-uy can also be enriched with blood.

Thailand and Laos 

Coagulated chicken, duck, goose or pig blood is used in soups, such as the classic Thai dish Tom Lued Moo (pork blood soup). Thailand also has a dish known as Nam Tok, which is a spicy soup stock enriched with raw cow or pig's blood. It is often used to enrich regular noodle dishes, as well as in Khao soi.

In Laos and Northeast Thailand), a raw version of laap, a meat salad, is made with minced raw meat, seasoned in spices, and covered with blood. The spicy noodle soup Nam ngiao and certain variants of Khao soi of the cuisine of Shan State and Northern Thailand contain diced curdled blood.

Vietnam 
In Vietnam, congealed pork blood is used in Bun bo Hue (a spicy noodle soup), as well as congee (a type of rice porridge). It is simply solidified, then put into the broth to absorb the flavor.
Blood is also consumed raw in Vietnam although it is not so popular nowadays due to health concern and a better understanding of how raw blood may contain parasites and other organisms that are harmful to humans.

This type of raw blood dish is called "tiet canh", literally translated as "blood soup". As its name suggests, the soup is prepared with raw and uncooked animal blood.
Firstly, blood is collected when the animal is slaughtered, then it is mixed with a little bit of fish sauce or salt water to prevent it from congealing (this step varies a lot from person to person and from region to region), this is to have time to prepare the other part of the dish, usually a mixture of the slaughtered animal's heart, liver, stomach, some time, its kidney, being diced and cooked.

Then, the cooked mixture is divided into serving portions. The blood is now mixed with regular drinking water (there is specific ratio between the blood and the water), then it will be poured onto the cooked mixture. After 10–15 minutes, the blood will start to congeal and the final product will have a consistency similar to jelly. Various herbs, roasted and smashed peanut are topped on the congealed blood to enhance its flavor.

This dish is usually made with pig's blood and duck's blood but it can also be made from any type of animal's blood.

In China and Vietnam certain types of snake blood are considered to be an aphrodisiac, and are drunk with rice wine.

Europe

Finland 
In Finland, pig's blood is used, with milk, flour and molasses, to make blood pancakes veriohukainen, usually served with lingonberry jam. Also different style of sausages are common, mustamakkara and ryynimakkara. In Bothnia region is verileipä that are bread where liquid of the batter either totally or partially blood. Blackpudding veripalttu is available is some parts of the country.

France 
In France, there is "sanquette", a solidified/curd blood in a pan, and "boudin noir", a sort of sausage.

Germany 
In Northern Germany pig's blood used to be traditionally mixed with vinegar, scraps, spices and sugar to make schwarzsauer. It is eaten warm or preserved in jars. Changes in taste and lifestyle have made this an uncommon dish.

Greece 
In ancient Lakedaimon, the Greek city-state of Sparta, the black broth was common: a soup with pork meat and blood.

Hungary 
In Hungary, hagymás vér (pan-fried pig's blood with onions) and véres hurka (a kind of blood sausage made with pig's blood, bacon, pork, rice, onion, salt and various herbs and spices) are common winter foods.

Italy 
In Italy, the sanguinaccio dolce is a pudding made with pig blood, chocolate, sugar, pine nuts, raisins and milk.

Biroldo is a blood sausage traditionally made with parts of pigs offal like heart, lungs and tongues.

Netherlands 
Balkenbrij is a Dutch food made by combining pig's blood with a variety of ingredients, principally flour or oatmeal, and pig organs, such as intestines. Black pudding, in Dutch "bloedworst," is also consumed. In the Limburg province bloedworst, in Limburgish "poetes" or "trip," is consumed with apples baked in a thick syrup called stroop.

Poland 
Czernina (black soup) is a Polish soup made of duck blood and clear poultry broth, sometimes known as "duck soup". Hen, rabbit or pig blood can also be used.

Kaszanka is the Polish incarnation of blood sausage. It's made of pig's blood and buckwheat or barley kasza.

Portugal 
In Portugal, the northern region known as Minho has a traditional blood soup named papas de sarrabulho. "Papas" translates as "mash" and "sarrabulho" is a popular expression for coagulated blood, so the literal translation would be "mashed blood". The soup is made with pig's blood, chicken meat, pork, ham, salami, lemon and bread, and is typically sprinkled with cumin, which provides the dish with its distinctive odor. It is usually served in the winter because it is a rather heavy dish. The dish is seldom eaten in southern Portugal. Also very popular, is morcela sausage, a type of black pudding. Another traditional Portuguese dish known as cabidela is also made by cooking chicken or rabbit in its own blood, sometimes diluted with vinegar. The same cabidela dish is done with lamprey eel's blood and flesh along with rice, during the months of March and April following the migration of these fishes throughout Portugal's rivers.
There's also a candy called Papas de moado, which is prepared from pig's blood, flour, sugar, nuts and spices, mainly in the Mondego River region.

Romania 
In Romania there is a traditional sausage prepared with blood named sângerete, literally meaning "a thing from hemoragy" (it came from sângera – "hemoragy" from sânge – "blood")), and it is prepared especially during the Ignat (the pig carving holiday).

Spain 
In Spain, the morcilla sausage is a kind of black pudding mainly made with pig blood, with spices, fat, and sometimes vegetables. In Andalusia sangre encebollada and Valencian sang amb ceba are popular dishes made with chicken or pork solidified blood and onion.

Sweden 
In Sweden, the blood soup svartsoppa, made with goose blood, is traditionally eaten on the eve of Saint Martin, especially in the southern region of Skåne. Other popular dishes, with blood as one of the ingredients include blodpudding (blood pudding), blodplättar (blood pancakes), blodpalt (potato dumplings flavoured with reindeer or pig blood) and paltbröd (bread with blood in it, which is dried and boiled and eaten together with fried pork and bèchamel or onion sauce).

United Kingdom and Ireland 
In Britain, Ireland, and some Commonwealth countries, "black pudding" or "blood pudding" is made from blood and some filler grains and spices, often oatmeal.

In Montgomeryshire, Wales, goose blood was used to make a pastry tart at Christmas time.

In Ireland, there is ample evidence of the persistence of the practice of bleeding live cattle until well into the 19th century. It was considered to be a preventative measure against cattle diseases, and the blood drawn, when mixed with butter, herbs, oats or meal, provided a nutritious emergency food.

See also

References

External links

 
 
Offal
Chinese cuisine
Korean cuisine
Thai cuisine
Vietnamese cuisine